Hussein Abdi Dualeh is a Somali politician and petroleum engineer. He is the former Minister of Energy & Minerals of Somaliland.

Biography
Dualeh was born in the Saraar region of Somaliland. At the age of five, he moved with his family to Aden in South Yemen. Upon returning he completed secondary education at SOS Sheikh Secondary School. After graduation he was hired by ADNOC selling lubricants and gasoline. In 1979 he started his engineering education at the University of Oklahoma and later worked for several American companies including Chevron Corporation and California's Metropolitan Transport Authority. He later joined the Peace, Unity, and Development Party and became chairman of the party's North American chapter, and was even naturalised as an American citizen.

In July 2010 he was visiting Hargeisa and met with Ahmed Mahamoud Silanyo who wanted him to join his possible future cabinet after the 2010 election. Since 2010 he has been Minister of Mining, Energy & Water Resources of Somaliland.

Personal life
Dualeh lived in Stevenson Ranch, California with his wife and three children until he relocated to Hargeisa to fulfill his duties as Minister of Mining, Energy & Water Resources of Somaliland.

References

Living people
Somalian Muslims
Somaliland politicians
Peace, Unity, and Development Party politicians
Year of birth missing (living people)
People from Hargeisa